Manzariyeh is a city in Isfahan Province, Iran.

Manzariyeh may also refer to:
 Manzariyeh Rural District, in Isfahan Province